Still Life with a Poem is an oil painting by Spanish artist Juan Gris, completed in 1915. Still life paintings are pieces where artists depict real objects but not from a specific viewpoint. Instead multiple viewpoints of a subject are depicted. The idea of space is rearranged as you can see in this oil painting. It is painted entirely of oils and imitates a collage on a wood grain table. The second part of this art piece that makes it unique is the poem is contained. At the bottom of the oil painting, you see Reverdy's poem which seems to be creating a comparison between two separate paintings. This was Gris's first truly collaborative piece. Previously, he had worked with Reverdy to create a collaborative work but was abandoned because of the difficulty of printing during the war. To better understand these art pieces we must better understand the two artists as well as what they were known for. 

Juan Gris 
was born in Madrid in 1887. He lived for only 39 years and passed in 1927. His real name was Jose Victoriano Gonzalez- Perez. Before becoming an artist he studies engineering. He created many famous works, including many pieces with Pierre Reverdy. The abstract art form, known as Cubism, was the most revolutionary art form in the 20th century. Originally developed by well-known figures like Picasso and Braque around 1907. Gris was a friend and neighbor of Picasso when living in Paris. Gris was known for refining this abstract art form into his own recognizable visual art form. As a recognizable figure in art, oftentimes he was referred to as 'the third cubist'.

Pierre Reverdy is one of the greatest modern French Poets. He was born in 1889 and passed in 1960. Like Gris, his work is well known and instantly recognizable. Reverdy was often described as a secret poet for secret readers. When Octavio Paz first described him like this, he talked about how often Reverdy would break the silence and disrupt empty spaces. Reverdy had always wished to not be well known, but his distinctive pieces helped him create the cubist poet population that he gained. His collaborative work with still-life paintings ended in 1927, due to the death of his peer Gris. Like Gris, Reverdy worked closely with Picasso and Braque.

References

1915 paintings
Paintings in the collection of the Norton Simon Museum
Cubist paintings
Still life paintings
Paintings by Juan Gris